The following is a list of National Collegiate Athletic Association (NCAA) Division I college lacrosse records for the NCAA Division I Men's Lacrosse Championship up through 2021.

Team performances

Winning percentages

Undefeated National Champions

There have been 14 undefeated NCAA champions out of 51 title games since 1971.

Notes

References

External links
NCAA page for men's lacrosse

Records